The Mailloux River is a tributary of the north shore of the St. Lawrence River, in the municipality of La Malbaie, in the Charlevoix-Est Regional County Municipality, in the administrative region of Capitale-Nationale, in the province of Quebec, in Canada.

The southern part of this small valley is accessible by the Chemin du Golf and the Boulevard de Comporté which runs along the south of the river, as well as by the Chemin du rang Saint-Charles. The main economic activities in this valley are linked to the urban economy and particularly to tourist accommodation. Agriculture and forestry characterize the upper part of this valley.

The surface of the Mailloux River is generally frozen from the beginning of December until the end of March; however, safe traffic on the ice is generally from mid-December to mid-March. The water level of the river varies with the seasons and the precipitation; the spring flood occurs in March or April.

Geography 
The Mailloux river takes its source from a small forest lake located on the northeast side of rang Saint-Joseph road, in agricultural and forestry areas. This small lake is located at:
  northwest of the top of a mountain;
  south-east of the village center of Sainte-Agnès;
  south-east of route 138;
  south of downtown Clermont;
  west of La Malbaie on the northwest bank of the St. Lawrence River.

  north-east in the forest zone, bending east to cross an agricultural zone, up to chemin du rang Saint-Charles;
  north-east in an agricultural and forestry area, to a stream (coming from the west);
  to the east along Chemin Mailloux, collecting two streams (coming from the southwest) and one stream (coming from the west), passing on the north side of the center of hamlet Rivière-Mailloux and crossing route 362 (boulevard de Comporté) at the end of the segment, until its mouth.

The Mailloux river flows on the west bank of La Malbaie located on the northwest bank of the Saint-Laurent river, in the heart of the village of La Malbaie. This mouth is located at:

  south-east of the bridge spanning the Malbaie River in downtown La Malbaie;
  north-west of the center of the hamlet of Pointe-au-Pic;
  north-west of Manoir Richelieu.

Toponymy 
The term "Mailloux" constitutes a family name of French origin.

The toponym "rivière Mailloux" was formalized on December 5, 1968 at the Place Names Bank of the Commission de toponymie du Québec.

Notes and references

Appendices

Related articles 
 Charlevoix-Est Regional County Municipality
 La Malbaie, a city
 St. Lawrence River
 Malbaie River
 List of rivers of Quebec

External links 

Rivers of Capitale-Nationale
Charlevoix-Est Regional County Municipality